Louise Wood Flanagan (born June 26, 1962) is a United States district judge of the United States District Court for the Eastern District of North Carolina.

Early life and education
Born in Richmond, Virginia, Flanagan graduated from Wake Forest University with her Bachelor of Arts degree in 1984 and later from University of Virginia School of Law with a Juris Doctor in 1988.

Career
Following law school graduation, Flanagan served as a law clerk for Judge Malcolm Jones Howard of the United States District Court for the Eastern District of North Carolina from 1988 to 1989. She was a private practice attorney in Washington, D.C. from 1989 to 1990 and North Carolina from 1990 to 1999.

District court service
Between 1995 and 2003, Flanagan served as a United States magistrate judge for the United States District Court for the Eastern District of North Carolina. Flanagan was nominated to the United States District Court for the Eastern District of North Carolina by President George W. Bush on January 29, 2003, to a seat vacated by James Carroll Fox. She was confirmed by the Senate on July 17, 2003, and received her commission the next day.

References

Sources

1962 births
Living people
Wake Forest University alumni
University of Virginia School of Law alumni
Judges of the United States District Court for the Eastern District of North Carolina
United States district court judges appointed by George W. Bush
21st-century American judges
United States magistrate judges
Lawyers from Richmond, Virginia
21st-century American women judges